Kỳ Anh is a town of Hà Tĩnh Province in the North Central Coast region of Vietnam. The town split from Kỳ Anh District in 2015.

References

Districts of Hà Tĩnh province
County-level towns in Vietnam